is a Japanese manga series by NAOE, serialized in Gangan Comics' shōnen manga magazine Monthly GFantasy from January 2013 to August 2019 and collected in eighteen tankōbon volumes. An anime television series adaptation was announced and aired from July 3 to September 18, 2015.

Characters

Toy Gun Gun

Hotaru is the Student Council President of her high school and is known for her brute strength, good reflexes, and a strong sense of justice. She claims to not let "evil doers" get away with their evil deeds, and is often noted to enjoy picking fights for the sake of what's right. Early examples include her beating up a student who was extorting money from a helpless classmate, and desiring revenge after learning that her best friend, Kanae, was conned by a Host (later going after said host on her quest for justice). She is often mistaken as male due to her appearance. She is next door neighbors with Masamune. Hotaru uses illeism, referring to herself as "Tachibana".

Masamune works as a Host, and is responsible for introducing Hotaru to the world of "Survival Games". He, together with his childhood friend, Tooru, form an alliance called the "Toy ☆ Gun Gun Team". He is unaware of the fact that Hotaru is actually female. To repay the damages caused by Hotaru to the club at which he works at, he offers her the chance to become a member of his team. Because of his past, he has abandonment issues, which later cause him to kick Hotaru out of the team, fearing she will leave him like his former friends/teammates and mother did. However, after Hotaru helps him face his past through a one-on-one challenge, he lets her rejoin. After Hotaru rejoins the team he develops feelings for her, but struggles with them as he does not know that Hotaru is female. There was a moment in his past where, after being abandoned by his mother, he grew suicidal. Nagamasa introduced him to survival games to convince him to live on.

Tooru is a manga artist who specializes in erotic comics. He is Masamune's childhood friend, both of them having shared the same dream of pursuing soccer as a career when they were young. He lives in the same apartment block as his teammates. Due to his past, when he was betrayed by friends he trusted, he has low self-confidence and often worries that Masamune might abandon him. He is also the most sensitive to others, being the first one to notice changes in the member's moods.

Haruki was the third member of Toy Gun Gun before Hotaru, who blamed Masamune for making him hate survival games. In truth, Haruki was overwhelmed by his younger twin brother Haruka during TGC and left the team because he felt that he wasn't strong enough. He intended to return to the team after he had trained significantly, but was surprised to hear that Hotaru had filled his spot. Although first antagonistic towards Hotaru, he eventually warms up to her and was brought back into the team as their fourth member. Haruki is also the first one of the team to find out that Hotaru is female. He wears a gas mask during his games.

Hoshishiro

Nagamasa is the leader of the survival game team Hoshishiro, which is the name of the hospital he works as a doctor at along with his teammates Fujimon and Ichi. He initially appears to be a very kind man, but he is the object of Tooru and Masamune's resentment due to what took place in the past. It is revealed that he beat up two former Toy Gun Gun players, but it was all within the rules of TGC. He and Masamune used to be close partners, but after being told by another survival game player that Masamune was also a strong vanguard, Nagamasa was convinced to end their partnership. Although brutal during survival games, Nagamasa is known to show kindness outside of it. He knows that Hotaru is a girl but kept a secret though it ended being a blackmail for Hotaru.

Nicknamed Fujimon, he is a member of Hoshishiro and works at hospital alongside the rest of his teammates. He fights using a minigun and can move fast despite the weight of his weapon. Due to his earnest and easy-going personality, he gets along well with Hotaru and often expresses concern for the Toy Gun Gun members.

Ichi is Hoshishiro's sniper. She appears to work as a nurse in the same hospital with Nagamasa and Takatora. She is the newest member of the team, brought in after Haruka's departure. As such she is unaware of the team's history, nor of Nagamasa's past with Masamune.

Haruka is Haruki's younger twin brother, who was the original third member of Hoshishiro until Haruki stopped playing survival games. Haruka has an obsession with his brother, and feels guilty for being the reason why Haruki quit survival games. He eventually returns to Hoshishiro, but unlike the other members of the team he expresses distrust for Nagamasa, finding it difficult to tell what he's planning. He hates when other people call his brother 'Haruharu'.

Others

Hanako is a close friend of Masamune. During a practice match, Hotaru temporarily becomes a member of her team and she instructs her to observe how the game is played.

Kanae is Hotaru's friend, and is the only one who knows of Hotaru being a girl (besides Haruki and Nagamasa, who find out later).

Media

Manga
Aoharu × Kikanjū is written and illustrated by NAOE. It started serialization in Square Enix's shōnen manga magazine Monthly GFantasy as a one-shot, on June 18, 2012, and later as a full-fledged series, on January 18, 2013. The manga ended on August 18, 2019. As of September 27, 2019, eighteen tankōbon volumes have been released in Japan.

Anime
An anime television series adaptation produced by Brain's Base and directed by Hideaki Nakano premiered on July 2, 2015 at TBS. It also aired at CBC at the same date and at MBS, TUT, and BS-TBS at later dates. The anime is licensed by AnimeLab in Australia and New Zealand and streamed it on their website as it airs in Japan. The anime has also been licensed in North America by Sentai Filmworks.

Reception
Anime News Network (ANN) had three editors review the first episode of the anime: Theron Martin found interest in the relationship dynamic between Hotaru and Masamune, a potential exploration of gender identity, and gave credit to the show's technical aesthetics despite lacking in palpable comedic moments; Nick Creamer was drawn in by the characterization of Hotaru but found criticism in the direction of both the plot and animation as feeling mediocre and typical of its given genre. The third reviewer, Rebecca Silverman, found the episode to be one of weakest debuts of its given season, criticizing the character of Hotaru and the storytelling she's placed in, and the middling production that's accessory to the delivery. Silverman said that: "If you're really into survival game shows and find mistaken gender hilarious, there might be more here for you than I found, but I'm also sure that there are better versions of both stories to be found elsewhere." Fellow ANN editor Gabriella Ekens reviewed the complete anime series in 2016. She commended the "fairly realistic depiction" of airsoft towards a female demographic and the initial character setup of Hotaru and Midori, but found the series overall unspectacular with its half-hearted delivery of both shōnen-ai and shōjo elements simultaneously, unfinished plot and an "irritating and hyperactive" English dub with only Greg Ayres' portrayal of Midori as the highlight, concluding that: "Although it contains some sparks of promise with a few characters who aren't entirely stereotypes, Aoharu x Machinegun is ultimately my least favorite type of show – boring, incomplete, and made for practically nobody. Skip."

Notes

References

External links
  
 Anime official website 
 

Airsoft
Anime series based on manga
Brain's Base
Gangan Comics manga
Manga adapted into television series
Sentai Filmworks
Shōnen manga
Sports anime and manga
TBS Television (Japan) original programming
Yen Press titles